World Clash is an annual reggae sound system clash.

The World Sound Clash was started by World Promotion in 1993, the first clash was at the Roller express in London. Bodyguard sound system was the first world sound champion.

The World Clash started in 1998 by promoters Irish and Chin and held in a different location each year.

Precursors to World Clash include the UK World Cup which took place in 1993 and 1994 in London, and the Canada World Clash which took place in 1993 in Toronto.

History

1993
 Location: Roller Express, Edmonton, London
 Host: Sass
 Participants:
  Coxsone
  Saxon Studio International
  Afrique
  Bodyguard
 Winner: Bodyguard

1994

 Location: Sanctuary Music Arena, Milton Keynes
 Host: Sass
 Participants:
  Kebra Negus
  Saxon Studio International
  King Addies
  Bodyguard
 Winner: Saxon Studio International

1998
 Location: Club Amazura, Queens, New York City
 Host: Squeeze
 Participants:
  Coxsone
  Downbeat
  Killamanjaro
 Winner: Killamanjaro

1999
 Location: The Warehouse, Brooklyn, New York City
 Host: DJ Roy
 Participants:
  Bass Odyssey (no show)
  Killamanjaro
  Mighty Crown
  Tony Matterhorn
 Winner: Mighty Crown

2000
 Location: Club Amazura, Queens, New York City
 Host: DJ Roy
 Participants:
  Bass 
  Killamanjaro
  Little Rock
  Pow Pow Movement
  Tony Matterhorn
  Mighty Crown
 Winner: Killamanjaro

2001
 Location: Club Amazura, Queens, New York City
 Host: Bounty Killer
 Participants:
  Bass Odyssey
  Black Kat
  King Tubbys
  Matsimela
  Mighty Crown
  Poison Dart
 Winner: Bass Odyssey

2002
 Location: Club Amazura, Queens, New York City
 Host: Elephant Man
 Participants:
  Bass Odyssey
  King Agony
  Rebel Tone
  Red Spider
  Ricky Trooper
  Tony Matterhorn
 Winner: Rebel Tone

2003
 Location: Club Amazura, Queens, New York City
 Host: Bounty Killer
 Participants:
  Black Cat
  King Agony
  Matsimela
  Mighty Crown
  One Love
  Rebel Tone
 Winner: Black Cat

2004
 Location: Club Amazura, Queens, New York City
 Host: Irish and Chin
 Participants:
  Black Kat
  Klassique
  LP International
  One Love
  Ricky Trooper
  Young Hawk
 Winner: Black Kat

2005
 Location: Elite Ark, Brooklyn, New York City
 Host: Noah
 Participants:
  Bass Odyssey
  Black Cat
  Desert Storm
  Immortal
  Mighty Crown
  Sentinel
 Winner: Sentinel

2006
 Location: Club Amazura, Queens, New York City
 Host: Irish
 Participants:
  Bass Odyssey
  Black Kat
  Black Reaction
  Ricky Trooper
  Sentinel
 Winner: Bass Odyssey

References

External links
 Irish and Chin website
(http://www.worldpromotionuk.com)

Music competitions
Dancehall
Reggae culture